Anton Ehmann (born 17 December 1972) is a retired Austrian football player.

National team statistics

Honours
 Austrian Football Bundesliga: 2003–2004
 Austrian Cup: 1999–2000, 2001–2002, 2003–2004

References

External links
 

1972 births
Living people
Austrian footballers
Austria international footballers
LASK players
SV Ried players
Grazer AK players
Association football defenders